İmirli can refer to:

 İmirli, Sungurlu
 Əmirli